"Old School" is a song by Canadian pop rock group Hedley. It was released in August 2008 as the fourth single from their second album, Famous Last Words/Never Too Late. It reached number 43 on the Canadian Hot 100 before it was officially released in August 2008, and peaked at number 10. The song was serviced to contemporary hit radio in the US on March 31, 2009.

Charts

References

2007 songs
2008 singles
Hedley (band) songs
Songs written by Jacob Hoggard
Universal Music Group singles